Stuffed eggplants (Iran: dolmeh bademjan,) are a dish typical of many countries.

Turkey
Eggplants are stuffed with meat (lamb) and rice or other vegetables. The ingredients include eggplant, minced meat, rice, onion, tomato paste, tomato, parsley, mint, salt, black pepper and sunflower oil. Optional ingredients include sumac, lemon juice, allspice, cinnamon, pine nuts, almonds, walnuts, mint, and olive oil which may be added for a better taste. In Turkey, two famous stuffed eggplant dishes are karnıyarık and İmam bayıldı.

Azerbaijan
Badımcan dolması includes tomato, sweet pepper, and aubergine stuffed with minced meat mixed with chickpeas.

Palestine and Israel
Eggplants are stuffed with meat (lamb or beef) and bulgur or rice but a bit distinctly than its neighbors because of a wider use of different flavors of the dish by region like tamarind, date, etc., also there is a wider use of spices than there is in Iran, Turkey and Azerbaijan. The ingredients include eggplant, minced meat, rice, bulgur, onion, tomato paste, sumac, tamarind juice, lemon juice, date honey, allspice, cinnamon, nutmeg, pine nuts, almonds, walnuts, tomato, parsley, mint, salt, black pepper and olive oil.

Italy

In Italy, stuffed eggplant are cooked in oven, and can be filled with mozzarella cheese (in Rome), or with minced meat (in Sicily). In Sicily, globe eggplants of the violet variety are used.

See also

 List of eggplant dishes
 List of stuffed dishes

References

Balkan cuisine
Stuffed vegetable dishes
Turkish cuisine dolmas and sarmas
Cuisine of Lazio
Cuisine of Sicily
Eggplant dishes
Lamb dishes